Tennis were contested at the 2006 Asian Games in Doha, Qatar from December 4 to December 14, 2006. Tennis had team, doubles, and singles events for men and women, as well as a mixed doubles competition.

The tennis competition was held at the Khalifa International Tennis and Squash Complex. India finished first in the medal table for the first time with two gold medals.

Schedule

Medalists

Medal table

Participating nations
A total of 130 athletes from 22 nations competed in tennis at the 2006 Asian Games:

See also
 Tennis at the Asian Games

References

External links

 
2006
Asian Games
2006 Asian Games events
2006 Asian Games